Bristol, Massachusetts may refer to:
 Bristol County, Massachusetts
 Bristol, Rhode Island, formerly a town in Massachusetts